Mats is a given name, a Scandinavian and Estonian form of Matthew or Matthias, and may refer to:

 Mats Berglind (1952–2016), Swedish politician
 Mats Bergman (born 1948), Swedish actor
 Mats Eilertsen (born 1975), Norwegian jazz musician and composer
 Mats Ekman (1865–1934), Estonian poet 
 Mats Engman (born 1954), Swedish Air Force major general
 Mats Frøshaug (born 1988), Norwegian ice hockey player
 Mats Grorud (born 1976), Norwegian director and animator
 Mats Gren (born 1963), Swedish footballer and coach
 Mats Gustafsson (born 1964), Swedish saxophone player
 Mats Haakenstad (born 1993), Norwegian footballer 
 Mats Hellström (born 1942), Swedish politician
 Mats Hinze (born 1970), Swedish far right-wing anarchist and attempted bomber
 Mats Hummels (born 1988), German footballer
 Mats Johansson (1951–2017), Swedish journalist and politician
 Mats Jonsson (born 1957), Swedish rally driver
 Mats André Kaland (born 1989), Norwegian footballer 
 Mats Kettilmundsson (ca. 1280–1326), Swedish knight, riksdrots and statesman
 Mats Kirkebirkeland (born 1989), Norwegian politician
 Mats Laarmann (1873–1964), Estonian politician
 Mats Lanner (born 1961), Swedish golfer
 Mats Lidström (born 1959), Swedish cellist, chamber musician, composer, teacher and publisher
 Mats Lillebo (born 1994), Norwegian footballer
 Mats Magnusson (born 1963), Swedish footballer
 Mats Møller Dæhli (born 1995), Norwegian footballer
 Mats Moraing (born 1992), German tennis player
 Mats Mõtslane (1884–1956), Estonian writer and politician
 Mats Nilsson (born 1983), Swedish grappler and mixed martial artist
 Mats Nilsson (born 1956), Swedish Air Force officer
 Mats Nõges (1879–1973), Estonian physician, editor and politician
 Mats Odell (born 1947), Swedish politician
 Mats Rosseli Olsen (born 1991), Norwegian ice hockey player 
 Mats Paulson (born 1938), Swedish singer and songwriter 
 Mats Persson, (born 1978), Swedish consultant and journalist
  Mats Persson, (born 1980), Swedish politician
 Mats Pertoft (born 1954), Swedish politician
 Mats Ronander (born 1954), Swedish rock musician
 Mats Rondin (1960–2014), Swedish cellist and conductor
 Mats Söderlund (born 1967), Swedish singer
 Mats Solheim (born 1987), Norwegian footballer 
 Mats Sundin (born 1971), Swedish ice hockey player
 Mats Traat (born 1936), Estonian poet and author
 Mats Wahl (born 1945), Swedish author
 Mats Wallberg (born 1949), Swedish ice speed skater 
 Mats Waltin (born 1953), Swedish ice hockey player
 Mats Wiking (born 1961), Swedish politician
 Mats Wilander (born 1964), Swedish tennis player
 Mats Zuccarello (born 1987), Norwegian ice hockey player

See also
 Matthew (given name)
 MATS (disambiguation)

References

Estonian masculine given names
Norwegian masculine given names
Scandinavian masculine given names
Swedish masculine given names